Filetto is an Italian comune of 930 people in the Province of Chieti in Abruzzo.

Physical geography

Hydrography
It's crossed by the Venna stream, which rises near Guardiagrele, runs for 24 km and flows into the river Foro.

Seismicity
It is located in Seismic Zone 2 (area with medium seismic hazard where strong earthquakes can occur).

Climate
 Climatic zone D
 Degree day 1801

Blazon of the coat of arms and the gonfalon

Coat of arms 
Red, silver hand contracted and driving from the tip. Under the shield, bifid and fluttering red list, the motto, in Roman capital letters, of gold FIDELITAS LIBERTAS. Exterior ornaments of the Italian Comunes

Gonfalon 
White draped richly adorned with silver embroidery and loaded with the civic coat of arms with the inscription centered in silver, bearing the name of the comune. The metal parts and the cords will be silvered and the vertical rod will be covered with white velvet with spiral places silver tacks. In the arrow will be represented the coat of arms of the comune and on the stem engraved the name. Tie with ribbons of silver fringed national colors.

References

Cities and towns in Abruzzo